Gavin Bernard Fox is bass player with the band Concerto for Constantine. Born in Dublin, Ireland, he has also been in the band Vega4, Scottish rock band Idlewild, and Irish indie rock bands Turn and Little Matador.Gavin is now a lecturer at BIMM Dublin, working alongside former band mate Ollie Cole. He continues to play bass as well as other instruments. He now plays in Dublin indie band "Sack".

References

Year of birth missing (living people)
Living people
Irish bass guitarists
Musicians from County Dublin